The 18th Division was a military formation of the Korean People's Army during the 20th Century.

Fought in the First Battle of Seoul. After the U.S. Marines ground down the hill defenses on Seoul's west side and entered Seoul proper on 25 September, the NKPA's 18th Division commander had decided that the battle was lost and began withdrawing his unit, which had been fighting in the Yongdungp'o area south of the Han River.

References

InfDiv0018
InfDiv0018NK